Strobilanthes kunthiana, known as Kurinji or Neelakurinji in Malayalam and Tamil and Gurige in Kannada is a shrub that is found in the shola forests of the Western Ghats in Kerala, Karnataka and Tamil Nadu. The purplish blue flower blossoms only once in 12 years, and gave the Nilgiri Mountains range its name, from the Malayalam language neela (blue) + Kurinji (flower). Of all long interval bloomers (or plietesials) Strobilanthes kunthiana is the most rigorously demonstrated, with documented bloomings in 1838, 1850, 1862, 1874, 1886, 1898, 1910, 1922, 1934, 1946, 1958, 1970, 1982, 1994, 2006 and 2018, these have no match to Solar cycles.

The Paliyan tribal people living in Tamil Nadu used it as a reference to calculate their age.<ref>Mike Kielty, Thursday Online, [http://www.tcs.cam.ac.uk/impact/features/the-lost-gardens-of-the-raj/ The Lost Gardens of the Raj]  (2008-3-4)</ref>
This plant flowers during September–October.

Description
Kurinji grows at an altitude of 1300 to 2400 metres. The plant is usually 30 to 60 cm high. They can, however, grow well beyond 180 cm under congenial conditions.

The kurinji plant belongs to the genus Strobilanthes which was first scientifically described by Christian Gottfried Daniel Nees von Esenbeck in the 19th century.  The genus has around 250 species, of which at least 46 are found in India. Most of these species show an unusual flowering behavior, varying from annual to 16-year blooming cycles.

Plants that bloom at long intervals like Strobilanthes kunthiana are known as plietesials. Other commonly used expressions or terms which apply to part or all of the plietesial life history include gregarious flowering, mast seeding and supra-annual synchronized semelparity (semelparity = monocarpy).

Other kurinji species, such as Strobilanthes cuspidatus, bloom once every seven years, and then die. Their seeds subsequently sprout and continue the cycle of life and death.

Masting
Some species of Strobilanthes are examples of a mass seeding phenomenon termed as masting which can be defined as "synchronous production of seed at long intervals by a population of plants". Strict masting only occurs in species that are monocarpic (or semelparous) -- individuals of the species only reproduce once during their lifetime, then die, as is the case with Strobilanthes kunthiana.

Habitat
Kurinji once used to cover the Anamalai Hills, Cardamom Hills, Nilgiri Hills, Palani Hills, Kudremukh and Bababudangiri like a carpet during its flowering season. Now plantations and dwellings occupy much of their habitat. Neelakurinji also bloomed in Chandra Drona Hill Ranges (Bababudan Giri) in Chikkamagaluru district of Karnataka in 2006. The whole of Bababudangiri Hills (Datta Peeta) were covered in a carpet of bluish purple flowers. It is expected to bloom again in 2018  Besides the Western Ghats, Neelakurinji is also seen in the Shevroy in the Eastern Ghats, Sanduru hills of Bellary district in Karnataka.

In 2006, Neelakurunji flowered again in Kerala and Tamil Nadu after a gap of 12 years.

In 2017, Neelakurinji flowers bloomed in the hills behind Kumaraswamy temple in Sanduru, Bellary district.

Conservation
Kurinjimala Sanctuary protects the kurinji in approximately 32 km2 core habitat in Kottakamboor and Vattavada villages in Idukki district of Kerala. The Save Kurinji Campaign Council organizes campaigns and, programs for conservation of the Kurinji plant and its habit. Kurinji Andavar temple located in Kodaikanal on Tamil Nadu dedicated to Tamil God Murugan also preserves Strobilanthes plants.
References in literature
Kurinji flower is used to describe the associated mountainous landscape where it blooms in Sangam Literature classical Tamil literature. The historical novel, Kurinji Flowers by Clare Flynn features the neelakurinji as a backdrop to a tragic love affair in 1940s India.

Prime Minister Narendra Modi also referenced the neelakurinji in his Independence Day speech in 2018, a year when the neelakurinji was in bloom.

See also
 Strobilanthes callosa''

References

 Sharma, MV et al. 2008. Reproductive strategies of Strobilanthes kunthianus, an endemic, semelparous species in southern Western Ghats, India. Botanical Journal of the Linnean Society. 157:155-163. .
 A Revision of the Strobilanthes kunthianus-Group (Phlebophyllum sensu Bremekamp) (Acanthaceae). Mark A. Carine, Jake M. Alexander and Robert W. Scotland. Kew Bulletin Vol. 59, No. 1 (2004), pp. 1–25

External links
 Accepted botanical name
 Kurinji flowers - Chikmagalur
 More information on neelakurinji
 Kurinji and its habitat
  When Munnar Blooms Blue in 2018 by Munnar Tourism

kunthiana
Flora of India (region)
Plants described in 1861